Street life or Streetlife may refer to:

Music

Albums
 Street Life (The Crusaders album), 1979
 Street Life (Fiend album), 1999
 Streetlife (Geeza album), 1977
 Streetlife (Sqeezer album)
 Street Life (Patrick Street album), a studio album by Patrick Street, 2002
 Street Life: 20 Great Hits, a compilation album of Roxy Music and Bryan Ferry songs, 1986

Songs
 "Street Life" (Roxy Music song), 1973
 "Street Life" (The Crusaders song), with Randy Crawford, 1979
 "Street Life", a song by Beenie Man
 "Street Life", a song by Kelly Rowland from Talk a Good Game
 "Streetlife", a song by Suede from A New Morning

Television
 Streetlife, a 1995 television film written and directed by Karl Francis

People
 Street Life (rapper), American rapper

Other uses
 Streetlife (charity), a charity for young homeless people in Blackpool, England
 Streetlife (website), a UK social networking website launched in 2011
 Streetlife: The Untold History of Europe's Twentieth Century, 2011 book by Leif Jerram